Cobbonchidae is a family of nematodes belonging to the order Dorylaimida.

Genera:
 Cobbonchulus Andrássy, 2009
 Cobbonchus Andrássy, 1958

References

Nematode families